Charles Hayes Rutherford, Arizona State Senator
Charles Smith Rutherford (1892–1989), Canadian soldier, recipient of Victoria Cross